William Durward Connor (February 22, 1874 – June 16, 1960) was a career United States Army officer who became a superintendent of the United States Military Academy after originally serving in the Corps of Engineers. While stationed in the Philippines, he participated in the Spanish–American War. He later served with the American Expeditionary Forces during World War I.

Early life and education
Connor was born in Wisconsin on  February 22, 1874; according to his 1925 passport application, he was born in the town of Newark, in Rock County. He received an appointment to West Point from Iowa, graduating first in his class in 1897; his Cullum Number is 3742. He received his commission as an engineer. Connor later graduated from the Army Staff College in 1905 and the Army War College in 1909.

Military career
He began his military career as an officer in the Corps of Engineers. During the Spanish–American War, he served in the Philippines as an engineer and was awarded a Silver Star for heroism in combat.

From 1909 to 1916, he was with the War Department General Staff and was promoted to colonel and appointed Deputy Chief of Staff of the American Expeditionary Forces (AEF) in 1917, following the entry of the United States in World War I in April 1917 (see American entry into World War I). In July 1918, he was promoted brigadier general, and given command of the 63rd Brigade, 32nd Infantry Division. At the Battle of Château-Thierry, he was awarded a second Silver Star, the citation for which reads:

For his World War I service, he was awarded the Distinguished Service Medal. The citation for the medal reads:

He also received the Order of the Bath from Britain and from France, he received the Croix de guerre and was named a Commander of the Legion of Honour. After the war he served as commanding general of American forces in France until 1920.

Returning to the United States, Connor served as the Chief of Transportation Service in 1921, Deputy Chief of Staff, US Army, in 1922 and commanding general of US Army forces in China, 1923 to 1926. He was promoted to major general in 1925, serving as commander of the 2nd Infantry Division until 1927, and as commandant of the Army War College until 1932. He served as the Superintendent at West Point from 1932 to 1938.

Later life
Connor retired from the US Army on 28 February 1938 but was recalled for service during World War II as Chairman of the Construction Advisory Committee, War Department on May 7, 1941. He remained in that capacity until March 31, 1942, when he reverted to the retired status. He died at Walter Reed Medical Center. and is buried at the West Point Cemetery, section 18, row G, grave 75.

Notes

References

1874 births
1960 deaths
People from Rock County, Wisconsin
United States Military Academy alumni
Military personnel from Wisconsin
United States Army Corps of Engineers personnel
American military personnel of the Spanish–American War
Recipients of the Silver Star
United States Army War College alumni
United States Army generals of World War I
United States Army generals
Superintendents of the United States Military Academy
United States Army generals of World War II
Burials at West Point Cemetery